Peno Township is an inactive township in Pike County, in the U.S. state of Missouri.

Peno Township was erected in 1819, taking its name from Peno Creek.

References

Townships in Missouri
Townships in Pike County, Missouri